Delmer is an unincorporated community in Cherokee County, located in the U.S. state of Texas.

Notes

Unincorporated communities in Cherokee County, Texas
Unincorporated communities in Texas